Spongiporus floriformis is a species of fungus belonging to the family Dacryobolaceae.

Synonym:
 Polyporus floriformis Quél., 1884 (= basionym)

References

Polyporales